Phycosoma is a genus of comb-footed spiders that was first described by Octavius Pickard-Cambridge in 1880.

Species
 it contains twenty-six species, found worldwide:
Phycosoma altum (Keyserling, 1886) – Mexico to Brazil. Introduced to Hawaii
Phycosoma amamiense (Yoshida, 1985) – Russia (Far East), China, Korea, Japan (mainland, Ryukyu Is.)
Phycosoma corrugum Gao & Li, 2014 – China
Phycosoma crenatum Gao & Li, 2014 – China
Phycosoma diaoluo Zhang & Zhang, 2012 – China
Phycosoma digitula Zhang & Zhang, 2012 – China
Phycosoma excisum (Simon, 1889) – Madagascar
Phycosoma flavomarginatum (Bösenberg & Strand, 1906) – China, Korea, Japan
Phycosoma hainanensis (Zhu, 1998) – China, Laos
Phycosoma hana (Zhu, 1998) – China
Phycosoma inornatum (O. Pickard-Cambridge, 1861) – Europe, Turkey, Azerbaijan
Phycosoma jamesi (Roberts, 1979) – Jamaica, Panama
Phycosoma japonicum (Yoshida, 1985) – Korea, Japan
Phycosoma labialis (Zhu, 1998) – China
Phycosoma ligulaceum Gao & Li, 2014 – China
Phycosoma lineatipes (Bryant, 1933) – USA to Brazil
Phycosoma martinae (Roberts, 1983) – Seychelles, India, China, Korea, Japan (Ryukyu Is.), Philippines
Phycosoma menustya (Roberts, 1983) – Seychelles
Phycosoma mustelinum (Simon, 1889) – Russia (Far East), China, Korea, Japan, Indonesia (Krakatau)
Phycosoma nigromaculatum (Yoshida, 1987) – China, Taiwan, Japan, Ryukyu Is.
Phycosoma oecobioides O. Pickard-Cambridge, 1880 (type) – New Zealand (mainland, Chatham Is.)
Phycosoma sinica (Zhu, 1992) – China, Vietnam
Phycosoma spundana (Roberts, 1978) – Seychelles
Phycosoma stellaris (Zhu, 1998) – China
Phycosoma stictum (Zhu, 1992) – China
Phycosoma stigmosum Yin, 2012 – China

See also
 List of Theridiidae species

References

Further reading

Araneomorphae genera
Cosmopolitan spiders
Taxa named by Octavius Pickard-Cambridge
Theridiidae